A tramline (also spelled: tram line) most commonly refers to the tracks and overhead wires used by trams, or a route in a tram network.

Tramline or Tramlines may also refer to:

Tramlines Festival, a music festival in Sheffield
Tramlining, the tendency of a vehicle's wheels to follow the contours in the surface upon which it runs
Tramway track, the tracks on which a tram runs
Lines on a tennis court